The men's pole vault at the 2014 European Athletics Championships took place at the Letzigrund on 14 and 16 August.

Medalists

Records

Schedule

Results

Qualification
Qualification: Qualification Performance 5.65 (Q) or at least 12 best performers advance to the final

Final

References

Qualification Results
Final Results

Pole vault
Pole vault at the European Athletics Championships